Johan Smith (born 2 December 1991) is a South African professional rugby union player who last played for the  in the Currie Cup and in the Rugby Challenge. His regular position is prop, but he also played as a hooker earlier in his career.

Rugby

Smith's first provincial call-up came at Under-18 level in 2009, when he represented the Leopards at the Craven Week tournament held in East London. In 2011, he was named in 's squad for the 2011 Varsity Cup competition, but he failed to make an appearance.

In the second half of 2012, Smith played for the s in the 2012 Under-21 Provincial Championship, where he was named in the matchday squad for all 12 of their matches, making 10 appearances.

He once again played in the Vodacom Cup competition in 2013, making three appearances off the bench. He made eight substitute appearances in total as the Leopards finished in third position on the log and losing their semi-final match 29–32 to the  after extra time.

He played in all seven of their round-robin matches, helping them top the log with six wins out of seven.

Smith started all nine of 's matches in the 2015 Varsity Cup competition, again helping his side reach the final of the competition, where they lost once again, this time losing 33–63 to Bloemfontein-based side . He was named in a Varsity Cup Dream Team after the competition, starting the team's match against the South Africa Under-20s, which ended in a 24–31 loss for the students. He also played in the Leopards' final two matches of the 2015 Vodacom Cup season against Namibian side  in Windhoek and against  in Cape Town. He scored his first try in the Currie Cup competition during the opening round of the 2015 Currie Cup qualification tournament, scoring after 22 minutes to set his team on the way to a 45–17 victory. He was a member of the  team that won the 2015 Currie Cup First Division. He featured in a total of thirteen matches during the 2015 Currie Cup qualification rounds and First Division proper and scored five tries for the side.

Powerlifting

In addition to rugby union, Smith also competes in powerlifting. He became the IPF champion in the 105 kg weight category in 2014.

References

South African rugby union players
South African powerlifters
Living people
1991 births
People from Merafong City Local Municipality
Rugby union props
Rugby union hookers
Southern Kings players
Sportspeople from Gauteng
Rugby union players from Gauteng